Barney is a British animated children's television series that aired on BBC One from 27 December 1988 to 26 April 1989. It also aired on Cartoon Network as part of their anthology series for younger children called Small World in the United States and Latin America.

Characters
Barney (voiced by Tim Brooke-Taylor): A good-natured Old English Sheepdog who has many adventures with his best friend Roger and constantly looks for fame and fortune.
Roger (voiced by Harry Enfield): A mischievous mouse who lives on the top of Barney's head inside his hair.
Desmond (voiced by Harry Enfield): An Afghan dog friend with sunglasses whose voice resembles that of Michael Caine, who serves as head of the TV house.
Corneila (voiced by Jan Ravens): a female chihuahua who sometimes is not very keen on Barney's attitude.
Francine (voiced by Jan Ravens): a friendly Irish setter who helps Barney on his quest for stardom.
Mr Prophet (voiced by Enn Reitel): a Spaniel who sometimes has a depressed attitude but is a good friend of Barney.
Lost and Found (voices uncredited): Two Dalmatian puppies who were found on Christmas Eve by Barney, and were given to a delighted Mr Prophet as a Christmas present.

Episodes

Home media
On 6 November 1989, BBC Enterprises released a single video cassette titled "Barney Gets Into Mischief", featuring all episodes except for the Christmas Special. Castle Music Ltd. later released another VHS release, titled "Barney: The Dog with Stars in his Eyes" on 1 June 1999, which included all thirteen episodes.

On 22 April 2002, Right Entertainment and Universal Pictures Video released another tape also titled "Barney Gets into Mischief and other stories", which consisted of the first eight episodes excluding the Christmas Special. This release was also released on DVD in August 2004, and the two companies later released the whole series on DVD in 2006.

Australian VHS release
Roadshow Entertainment released "Barney: The Dog with Stars in his Eyes" on VHS on 31 October 2000, containing all thirteen episodes.

References

External links
Toonhound

1988 British television series debuts
1989 British television series endings
1980s British animated television series
1980s British children's television series
BBC children's television shows
English-language television shows
Animated television series about dogs
Animated television series about mice and rats